Afro-Bolivians are Bolivian people of Sub-Saharan African heritage and therefore the descriptive "Afro-Bolivian" may refer to historical or cultural elements in Bolivia thought to emanate from their community. It can also refer to the combining of African and other cultural elements found in Bolivian society such as religion, music, language, the arts, and class culture. The Afro-Bolivians are recognized as one of the constituent ethnic groups of Bolivia by the country's government, and are ceremonially led by a king who traces his descent back to a line of monarchs that reigned in Africa during the medieval period. They numbered 432,000 according to the 2012 census.

History of slavery in Bolivia

In 1544, the Spanish Conquistadors discovered the silver mines in a city now called Potosí, which is on the base of Cerro Rico. They began to enslave the natives as workers in the mines. However, the health of the natives working in the mines became very poor, so the Spanish began to bring in enslaved Sub-Saharan Africans to work in the mines. Slaves were brought as early as the 16th century in Bolivia to work in mines. In Potosí during the 17th century 30,000 Africans were brought to work in the mines from which the total population of Potosí which numbered around 200,000. Slaves were more expensive in Bolivia then other parts of the Spanish colonies costing upwards to 800 pesos. This was due to the fact that they had to be bought from slave ports in the coastal region of the Spanish empire and had to trek from cities like Cartagena, Montevideo, and Buenos Aires to Bolivia.

Slaves were put to work in difficult conditions. Some slaves working in the mines survived no more than a few months. Initially, the slaves were not used to working at such a high altitude. Many of these Native and African workers' lives were cut short because of the toxic smelter fumes and mercury vapors they inhaled while working the mines. Slaves worked in the mines for 4 months on average. As such they had to be blindfolded upon leaving the mines to protect their eyes, which had become adapted to darkness.

Although it was a requirement for Natives and Africans over 18 years of age to work in the mines for 12-hour shifts, younger children were still reputed to be put to work in the mines. These children worked fewer hours; however, they were still exposed to the same extremely harsh conditions of all the miners, including asbestos, toxic gases, cave-ins, and explosions. It is estimated that as many as eight million Africans and Natives died from working the mines between 1545, when the Spaniards first put the Natives to work, until 1825, the end of the colonial period.

Many newly brought slaves died due to harsh conditions and weather. The Spaniards' way of fortifying the slaves against the  conditions in the mines was to provide them with coca leaves to chew. By chewing coca leaves, the slaves numbed their senses to the cold, as well as dampening the feeling of hunger and alleviating altitude sickness. Just like the mines of Potosí, coca plantations became a cash-crop of the region. Thousands of slaves were shipped to cultivate and process coca leaves on Haciendas, like the ancestors of Julio Pinedo.

The Yungas

After their emancipation in the year 1827 (although its enforcement being postponed to 1851), Afro-Bolivians would relocate to a place called the Yungas. The Yungas, which is not far north from the city of La Paz, is where most of the country's coca is grown. In parts of the Yungas such as Coroico, Mururata, Chicaloma, Calacala-Coscoma, and Irupana are a large number of Bolivians of African heritage. Before the Bolivians relocated to the Yungas, it was a place mostly inhabited by indigenous Aymara people and mestizos (European and Native mixed people).

Culture

Saya music 

The biggest African influence in Bolivian culture is Saya music or La Saya. The word saya originates from Kikongo , referring to the act of singing while performing communal work. Although Saya is growing in popularity in Bolivia it is still very misunderstood. The reason for this lack of understanding of saya is because the interpretation of the instruments as well as the rhythm is very peculiar. It involves Andean instruments incorporated with African percussion. The primary instrument is the drum, which was passed on by their African ancestors, along with gourds, shakers, and even jingles bells that are attached to their clothing on the ankle area.

During the performance of saya, the Afro-Bolivians wear Aymara style clothing. The women wear a bright multi-colored blouse with ribbons, a multi-colored skirt called a “pollera”, with a “manta” (back cover) in their hand, and a bowler hat. The men on the other hand, wear a hat, feast shirt, an Aymara style sash around the waist, woolen thick cloth pants called “bayeta pants”, and sandals.

Every rhythm of Saya begins with the beating of a jingle bell by the Caporal (foreman) who guides the dance. This Caporal (also called capataz) guides the dancers with a cudgel (whip) in hand, decorated pants, and jingle bells near the ankles. The women, who have their own guide during this dance, sing while moving their hips, shaking their hands, as well as dialoguing with the men who play the bass drum and coancha.

Caporales

Caporales is a dance popular in the Andean region of Bolivia. It gained popularity in 1969 by the Estrada Pacheco brothers, inspired by the character of the 'Caporal' or "overseer" of which, historically black slaves, usually mixed race, wore boots and held a whip, the dance originates from the region of the Yungas in Bolivia. However, elements of the dance (such as the costumes) were of European origin.

Morenada

Morenada is a folkloric dance in Bolivia. The dance originated with sufferings of the African slaves brought to Bolivia in order to work in the Silver Mines of Potosí. The enormous tongue of the dark masks was meant to represent the physical state of these mines workers and the rattling of the Matracas are frequently associated with the rattling of the slaves' chains and satirizing "white men".

Language 
Afro-Bolivians have traditionally maintained their own creole language, with links to earlier Bozal Spanish.

Afro-Bolivian monarchy

The Afro-Bolivian Royal House is a ceremonial monarchy officially recognized as part of the Plurinational State in Bolivia. The royal house are the descendants of a royalty that were brought to Bolivia as slaves. The founding monarch, Uchicho, was allegedly of Kongo and Senegalese origin, and was brought to the Hacienda of the Marquis de Pinedo, in the area of Los Yungas in what is now La Paz Department. Other slaves allegedly recognized him as a man of regal background (a prince from the ancient Kingdom of Kongo) when seeing his torso exposed with royal tribal marks only held by royalty, later being crowned in 1823. The monarchy still lives on to the present day and the current Monarch, King Julio Pinedo is a direct descendant of him.

Keeping the culture

Although these Afro-Bolivians were free, they still had a difficult battle in trying to maintain their culture. Many elements of their culture began to disappear and become endangered. They had to fight very strongly against the colonial aggression and exclusion of their post-emancipation culture. Aspects such as feasts, their creole language (that has since decreolized), religion that survived through colonialism have since gone extinct, culturally, although fragments remain.
Afro-Bolivians due to isolation from much of Bolivia speak a dialect of Bolivian Spanish, akin to African-American Vernacular English in the United States. Afro-Bolivians, in addition to being Roman Catholic incorporate elements of African diasporic religions such as rituals in the Macumba and Voodoo religions have influence their practice of Christianity, mainly prevalent in the towns of Chicaloma and Mururata. One of the ways that they were able to hold on to this culture was through their music and dance. Musical traditions such as dances, instruments, and techniques with ancestral origin in Sub-Saharan Africa, to the present day define Afro-Bolivian identity.

Afro-Bolivians today

It has been estimated that 25,000 Afro-Bolivians live in the Yungas. They are proud of their culture and have fought very hard to preserve it. In fact, in the town of Mururata, the Afro-Bolivians managed to maintain their traditional culture, to the point of maintaining a continuous Afro-Bolivian monarchy currently led by Julio Pinedo. Afro-Bolivians spread to the east in Cochabamba and Santa Cruz de la Sierra.

Despite the Afro-Bolivian community fervently working to preserve their culture, many Afro-Bolivians have reported experiencing severe racism and feelings of isolation from society due to intolerance. Laws that actually criminalize racism and discrimination in Afro-Bolivia have slowly been ratified as the first anti-discriminatory law (law 45) was passed in 2010 and was met with violent protesting and rioting. In 2009 President Evo Morales added amendments to the national constitution that outlined the rights of Afro-Bolivians and guaranteed the protection of such liberties. The amendments also generally extended to indigenous peoples and officially recognized Afro-Bolivians as a minority group in Bolivia despite them not being included in the national census three years later. In addition to the country's constitution being updated in 2009, President Morales created the Vice Ministry for Decolonization to create policies that criminalize racism while working to improve literacy and create better race relations in Bolivia. The Vice Ministry for Decolonization also works to dismantle colorism and racism influenced by European colonization while also promoting the philosophy of "intercultural-ity" in which citizens of the nation recognize every ethnic groups' traditions and cultural practices as contributions to society.

Notable Afro-Bolivians

Politics

Ceremonial monarchy
  Julio Pinedo, Current Afro-Bolivian king
  Bonifacio Pinedo, Former Afro-Bolivian king

Government
  Mónica Rey Gutiérrez, supranational delegate to the Plurinational Legislative Assembly of Bolivia

Activism
  Marfa Inofuentes, Afro-Bolivian activist

Sports

Basketball
  Josh Reaves, professional basketball player for the Dallas Mavericks of the NBA

Soccer
  Edemir Rodríguez, football player, currently playing for Club Bolivar
  Jairo Quinteros, football player on loan to Club Bolivar from Inter Miami CF 
  Leonel Morales, football player
  Augusto Andaveris, football player
  Ramiro Castillo, football player
  Gustavo Pinedo, football player
 Marcelo Moreno Martins
 Jaime Arrascaita
 Joel Bejarano
 Marc Enoumba

See also

Caporales
Afro-Bolivian Saya
Yungas

External links
Afro-Bolivian family

References

 
Cuba
La Paz Department (Bolivia)
Ethnic groups in Bolivia
Angolan diaspora